Molla Mehdi (also Romanized as Mollā Mehdī) is a village in Dodangeh Rural District, in the Central District of Behbahan County, Khuzestan Province, Iran. At the 2006 census, its population was 168, in 30 families.

References 

Populated places in Behbahan County